The North Carolina Central University School of Law (also known as NCCU School of Law or NCCU Law)  is the law school associated with North Carolina Central University. The school is fully accredited by the American Bar Association (ABA)  and the North Carolina State Bar Council, and is a member of the Association of American Law Schools (AALS). According to NC Central's official 2018 ABA-required disclosures, 37.9% of the Class of 2018 obtained full-time, long-term, JD-required employment nine months after graduation.

Admissions 
The North Carolina Central University School of Law tightened the admission practices by imposing a minimum LSAT score on future applications in response to the American Bar Association's December 2017 query about its admission standards.  Applicants must score at least 142 on the LSAT to be eligible to proceed with NCCU School of Law admission.

Academics 
The school offers a full-time day program and a part-time evening program. Full-time professors and clinical instructors, including 28 women and 28 minorities, work with a number of adjunct and visiting professors to teach approximately 576 students in both programs.

The  school  offers the Juris Doctor as well as two joint degrees—the Juris Doctor/Master of Business Administration (J.D./M.B.A.) and the Juris Doctor/Master of Library Science (J.D./M.L.S.).

In 2007, the law school launched a Civil Rights and Constitutional Law Concentration for students interested in developing a deeper understanding of civil rights law and history. There are four additional certificate programs available:  Biotechnology and Pharmaceutical Law, Dispute Resolution, Tax Law, and Justice in the Practice of Law.

In 2012, the school launched its Maritime Law Summer program with the University of North Carolina at Wilmington.  The program offers students a unique opportunity to complete coursework in admiralty law and coastal policy from practitioners and experts in both fields.

History 
The North Carolina General Assembly enacted House Bill 18 on March 1, 1939, authorizing a law school at North Carolina College for Negroes (now known as North Carolina Central University). The only previous school open to blacks in the state had been at Shaw University, in Raleigh, which closed its law school in 1914, leaving no in-state option for blacks to receive a formal education in law. The legislation was intended to create a separate-but-equal option for blacks who wanted to become lawyers, without integrating the law school at the University of North Carolina at Chapel Hill.  The Bill authorized the Board of Trustees to establish the North Carolina College for Negroes Law School and announced it would open in the fall of 1939. Due to the amount of time the college had to prepare and advertise the law school, only one student registered, resulting in the administration delaying the opening to the following year.

Facilities 

The school is located in Durham, North Carolina on the campus of NCCU in the Albert L. Turner Building. The Turner Building is an 87,672 sq. ft. four-story brick structure that contains  moot courtrooms, a model law office, classrooms, and an administrative wing. The Turner Building has 6 high-tech smart classrooms, two distance learning classrooms, and two high tech smart seminar rooms.

The NCCU Law Library contains over 400,000 volumes and volume equivalents, and provides an environment for study and research. The ground floor of the building contains individual offices for student organizations, a student lounge, and canteen/vending area. There is a fully equipped computer lab and wireless internet throughout the building. The Great Hall, an atrium located on the first floor, allows the School of Law to comfortably host workshops, other seminars and special events.

Technology 
In the fall of 2010, the school received approximately $2 million in funding from the U.S. Commerce Department's National Telecommunications and Information Administration (NTIA) to expand broadband infrastructure and deliver legal services throughout the state.

Technology Assisted Legal Instruction and Services, (also known as TALIAS), expands access to the School's legal education and clinical programs. TALIAS employs a fully immersive telepresence environment for both undergraduate courses and legal assistance at four Historically Black Colleges and Universities – Elizabeth City State University, Fayetteville State University, North Carolina Agricultural and Technical State University, and Winston-Salem State University.

Clinics 
NCCU School of Law supports the following:
Alternative Dispute Resolution Clinic
Civil Litigation Clinic
Criminal Defense Clinic
Criminal Prosecution Externship
Domestic Violence Clinic
Family Law Clinic
General Externship
Juvenile Law Clinic
Low Income Taxpayer Clinic
Public Interest Externship
Small Business and Community Development Clinic
Street law Clinic
Veterans Law Clinic

Institutes

Biotechnology and Pharmaceutical Law Institute 
The Biotechnology and Pharmaceutical Law Institute has been established as a center of excellence in the field of biotechnology and pharmaceutical law, with a multidisciplinary approach in teaching, research and publications. Its mission is to make substantial contributions to the development of global biotechnology and pharmaceutical law and to the investigation and examination of contemporary issues in U.S. regulatory affairs issues.

Dispute Resolution Institute 
The Dispute Resolution Institute is intended to provide training in alternative dispute resolution.

Journals

North Carolina Central Law Review 
Established in 1967, the North Carolina Central Law Journal, changed its name to the North Carolina Central Law Review in the spring of 2007. The Law Review contains articles written by legal scholars, judges, practitioners and academics.

Biotechnology and Pharmaceutical Law Review 
Established in 2006, the Biotechnology and Pharmaceutical Law Review seeks to publish a professional periodical devoted to these areas that are useful to judges, practitioners, teachers, legislators, students and others interested in these practice areas.

Leadership 
Browne C. Lewis is the current dean; she became dean in June of 2020.  The former deans of NCCU School of Law are:

Maurice T. Van Hecke, 1939–1942
Albert L. Turner, 1942–1965
Daniel G. Sampson, 1965–1969
LeMarquis DeJarmon, 1969–1976
Harry E. Groves, 1976–1981
Charles E. Daye, 1981–1985
Thomas M. Ringer, 1985–1986
Louis Westerfield, 1986–1990
Mary E. Wright, 1990–1994
Percy R. Luney, Jr., 1994–1998
Janice L. Mills, 1998–2005
Raymond C. Pierce, 2005–2012
Phyliss Craig-Taylor, 2012–2018
Elaine O’Neal, 2018-2020

Notable alumni 
Willie Gary (1974) is a successful lawyer.
George Kenneth "G. K." Butterfield, Jr. (1974) is the U.S. representative for North Carolina's 1st congressional district, serving since 2004.
Wanda G. Bryant (1982) was the first African-American woman to be an Assistant District Attorney in the 13th prosecutorial district of North Carolina.  She is currently an Associate judge on the North Carolina Court of Appeals.
Michael F. Easley (1976) became the first NCCU Law alumnus to serve as Attorney General and Governor of the State of North Carolina.
Stormie Forte (2002), the first African-American woman and first openly LGBTQ woman to serve on the Raleigh City Council.
Robert D. Glass (1951), the first African American to serve as a justice of the Connecticut Supreme Court.
Maynard Jackson (1963) was the first African-American mayor of Atlanta in 1974. At age 35, he was the youngest person to be elected to the office.
Clifton E. Johnson (1967) was the first African-American Assistant State Prosecutor for North Carolina since the 19th century (1969), the first African-American District Court judge in North Carolina, the first African-American Chief District Court judge, and the first African-American Resident Superior Court judge for North Carolina. He was the first African-American to be appointed to the North Carolina Court of Appeals. While serving on the appellate court he rose to the rank of Senior Associate judge and served as the state's first African-American chairman of the North Carolina Judicial Standards Commission.
Leroy R. Johnson (1957) was the first African-American member of the Georgia State Senate since reconstruction. He also became the first African-American lawyer in the southeast to be employed on the United States District Attorney's staff in Atlanta; the first African-American to head a legislative delegation; and the first African-American to be named chairman of a standing committee in the Georgia General Assembly.
Floyd B. McKissick, Sr. (1951) became National executive director of the Congress of Racial Equality (CORE). In 1972, he launched Soul City, North Carolina, the first new town sponsored primarily by African-American enterprise.
Jonathan Melton, (2011), first openly-gay member of the Raleigh City Council.
H.M. "Mickey" Michaux, Jr. (1964) was the first African-American in the 20th Century to serve as a United States Attorney in the South. He was a member of the North Carolina General Assembly; upon his retirement, he was its longest-serving member. The NCCU School of Education building was named after Representative Michaux on June 15, 2007.
Elaine O'Neal, first African-American woman to be Mayor of Durham, former North Carolina Superior Court judge
Marshall Pitts Jr. (1990), Mayor of Fayetteville, North Carolina (2001–2005).

Rankings 
7th, Best Schools for Bar Exam Preparation, 2012
4th, Top Law Schools for Clinical Opportunities, 2011
25th, Best Public Interest Law Schools, 2011
4th, Most Diverse Law Schools, 2011
9th, Most Popular Law Schools, 2010
1st, Best Value Law Schools, 2009 & 2007
7th, Most Diverse Faculty, 2009
20th, Best Law Schools in Practical Training, 2008
 147-193th, U.S. News Best Law Schools, 2022

Employment 
According to NC Central's official 2018 ABA-required disclosures, 37.9% of the Class of 2018 obtained full-time, long-term, JD-required employment nine months after graduation. NCCU's Law School Transparency under-employment score is 31.8%, indicating the percentage of the Class of 2018 unemployed, pursuing an additional degree, or working in a non-professional, short-term, or part-time job nine months after graduation.

Costs 
For 2021 tuition was full-time $13,544 (in-state), full-time $36,116 (out-of-state), part-time
$10,084 (in-state), and part-time $27,088 (out-of-state).The total cost of attendance (indicating the cost of tuition, fees, and living expenses) at North Carolina Central for the 2013–2014 academic year is $43,915. The Law School Transparency estimated debt-financed cost of attendance for three years is $116,984 for residents and $169,249 for non-residents.

References

External links 
 

North Carolina Central University
Law schools in North Carolina
Universities and colleges in Durham, North Carolina
Historically black law schools